Chapter Eleven is the second studio album by guitarist Michael Lee Firkins, released on November 7, 1995 through Shrapnel Records.

Track listing

Personnel
Michael Lee Firkins – guitar, engineering, mixing, production
Mike van der Hule – drums
Dennis Murphy – bass (except tracks 6, 8, 10)
Terry Miller – bass (tracks 6, 8, 10)
Wally Buck – engineering
Greg Forsberg – mixing
Chris Collins – mixing
Eddy Schreyer – mastering

References

External links
Michael Lee Firkins "Chapter Eleven" at Guitar Nine Records

1995 albums
Shrapnel Records albums